Ruth E. Edwards, a.k.a. Ruth·ology, is a book artist, instructor and founder of Books in Black, a collective of African American book makers.

Biography
Ruth E. Edwards was born in New York. She received her undergraduate degree in business from Pace University. In 1998, after a career as an administrator for a major New York bank, Edwards was introduced to handmade book arts. She took various bookmaking courses at the Center for Book Arts in New York City to learn the craft. Edwards would later serve on the Center for Book Arts Board of Directors from 2001 to 2004.

Ruth·ology
Edwards creates and publishes unique and limited-edition artists books of various structures such as accordion, miniature, eight-page single sheet, pop-up, scrolls, and star or carousel books under the name Ruth·ology.

Edwards’ work, Black Rodeo, was included in the landmark Minnesota Center for Book Arts 2007 exhibit “We, Too, Are Book Artists” curated by Amos Paul Kennedy. The exhibit showcased unique books by twenty-three artists including Ben Blout, Dindga McCannon, Clarissa Sligh, Danny Tisdale, Trenton Doyle Hancock, Kara Walker, and Bisa Washington. The exhibition was the “first large-scale exhibit of African-American book art.”

Selected works 
The following are selected titles created by Edwards.
 Black Rodeo, illustrations by Izell Glover, limited edition, 2003. Star book structure with leather cover. Included in the 2007 exhibit "We, Too, Are Book Artists."   
 Book, 14-page whimsical miniature book, limited edition of 121, 1998. Included in the UCLA Library Department of Special Collections, Young Research Collection. 
 The Circus (2002), Included in the 2003 Instructors Exhibition at the Center for Book Arts, NY. 
 How the Sandwich Got Its Name, limited edition, circa. 2005. Short history of the sandwich from its invention by the Earl of Sandwich.
 On the Ropes, about Jack Johnson, the first black heavyweight champion. One of a kind, circa. 2003.
 Read, 14-page miniature book and companion to Book, limited edition of 121, circa 1998.
 She Put a Dent In It!, biography of Clotilde Dent Bowen, MD, the first Black woman to attain the rank of Colonel in the United States Army. One of a kind, circa. 2003.
 The Steps of A Giant, about Colin L. Powell. One of a kind, circa. 2003.
 Tits: The Indignities Thrust Upon Sisters, Limited edition, circa. 2000. Comical look at annual mammograms. 
 With Care. A dos-a-dos book structure, housed in a wooden box. One side has text by Edwards. The other side has illustrations by Tom Feelings.

Books in Black

Books in Black is a collective of individual African Americans and others from the African diaspora who are “ordinary people who make extraordinary books.”  The group informally came together in late 2002 to crafts books for a Black History Month program. Following the successful reception of its 2003 exhibit, Edwards formally organized the group. The collective focused on creating unique books that highlighted aspects of African American history and achievement. "We are not trying to write an encyclopedia. We write a few sentences to steer people in the right direction, and to say, this was one man and he made one heck of a contribution," Edwards told one reporter.

Professionally, members included art and music teachers, computer specialists, crafters, dollmakers, event planners, illustrators, librarians, photographers, and mixed media artists. Exhibiting members include Edwards, the collective's founder, and the following:

 Jamil Abdul-Azim
 Kamari Allah
 Gail Beckford
 R. Gregory Christie
 Vernell Conyers
 Francine J. Davis
 Valerie Deas
 Shirley Eddings
 Brenda H. Falus
 Ione M. Foote
 Cheryl Shackelton Hawkins
 Paula Holland
 Cleo Meri Abut Jarvis
 Katrina Jeffries
 Wanda Jones
 Yvonne Lamar-Rogers
 Evemnise Landsman
 Irene M. Mays
 Sandra Oei
 Andrea Ramsey
 Sandra Redman
 Shimoda
 Dolores Taylor
 Harriette Washington-Williams
 JoAnn Williams

Selected exhibitions
Edwards curated each Books in Black exhibition. Each exhibit included promotional postcards and distinctively-made catalogs or exhibition lists.

Co-op City Youth and Book Arts
Edwards, a longtime resident of Co-op City in the Bronx, taught book arts and other life skills to children ages 12 to 18 from 2007 to 2011 through the Scholarship Incentive Awards Program, which she founded. In 2008, the young people collected recipes and created a limited-edition cookbook titled “What’s Cookin? Recipes of the Elders."

Electrified by the election of President Barack Obama, eight young people in the Scholarship Incentive Awards Program created an artists' book inspired by their hopes for the new leader. Each participant wrote a personal letter expressing their hopes to the president. Each focused on a specific topic and created the accompanied illustrations. The participants included Tara E. Davis (the economy), Samantha M. Medina (education), Matthew Salmon (health care), Anthony Purnell (war), Newton V. Salmon (domestic energy), Shaneice Silvera (global warming), Quinten Campbell (international relations) and Bryce Campbell (racial harmony). Edward instructed the participants and designed the 30-foot long accordion book.

Deborah Willis, co-author of the book Obama: The Historic Campaign in Photographs, met with the group and helped raised funds for the project.  Over several months the teens handmade sixteen copies of the accordion-fold book.

In August 2009, during Co-op City's annual National Night Out, Bronx Borough President Rubén Díaz Jr. and Congressman Joseph Crowley joined Edwards and the teens to unfurl and display the 30-foot long book to festival attendees. Crowley's office was instrumental in delivering a copy of the book to the White House in 2010.

In 2014, President Obama's To Do List, the artists' book Edwards and her eight young students created, was added to the Smithsonian Libraries permanent collection. Doug Litts, head of the American Art Museum/National Art Museum Library at the time, noted that “only 6 to 10 books from throughout the nation are added to the collection each year.”

External links

References

Living people
1940 births
American art curators
American women curators
Women book artists
African-American women artists
Pop-up book artists
Pace University alumni
21st-century African-American people
20th-century African-American people
20th-century African-American women
21st-century African-American women